A trumbash or trombash is a Mangbetu throwing knife from the Democratic Republic of Congo.

Uses 
Similar to a sickle, the trumbash was used as a throwing weapon or as currency. The handle is usually made of wood, but it can be made of ivory or bone. It is more or less decorated, according to the rank of its owner and the use that is made of it. The curved blade is made of iron.

Gallery

References

Bibliography 
 Jan Elsen, De fer et de fierté, Armes blanches d’Afrique noire du Musée Barbier-Mueller, 5 Continents Editions, Milan, 2003, 
 Tom Crowley, Andrew Mills, Weapons, Culture and the Anthropology Museum, 2018

Blade weapons
Throwing axes
Axes
African weapons
Daggers
Knives
Throwing weapons